Jiangmen, alternately romanized in Cantonese as Kongmoon, is a prefecture-level city in Guangdong Province in southern China. It consists of two urban districts (Pengjiang, Jianghai), Heshan, and the more rural Siyi (Xinhui, Taishan, Kaiping, and Enping), which is the ancestral homeland of approximately 4 million overseas Chinese.  As of the 2020 census, the entire prefecture has a total population of about 4,798,090 inhabitants; its urban region (Pengjiang, Jianghai, plus Heshan being conurbated) has 2,657,062 inhabitants, which can also be considered part of the Guangzhou–Shenzhen metro conurbation with 65,565,622 inhabitants.

Names
The Postal Map spelling "Kongmoon" was based upon the same name's Cantonese pronunciation Gong¹-moon⁴. Other forms of the name include Kongmoon, Kongmun, and Kiangmoon.

Jiangmen is also known as Pengjiang. Its rural hinterland is known to the Chinese diaspora as the "Four Counties" (q.v.), although the addition of Heshan to Jiangmen has prompted the remaining locals to begin calling it the "Five Counties" instead.

History
Jiangmen was forced to open up to western trade in 1904, after a 1902 declaration which made it a treaty port. During the subsequent period of western influence, a number of western-style buildings were constructed along the city's waterfront, and currently, the city's government is partaking in a renewal project to restore many of these buildings.

On 6 August 1925, the Guangdong provincial government placed Jiangmen under direct administration of the provincial government. Jiangmen was given a city government on 26 November of the same year. In 1931, this status would be revoked, and the city was placed under the administration of Xinhui County.

The city was incorporated into the People's Republic of China on 23 October 1949, and was proclaimed a city in 1951. The city later became the prefectural seat for the Sze Yup ("Four County") region including Taishan, Kaiping, Xinhui, Enping. In Mainland China but not abroad, the area became known as the "Five Counties" when Heshan was added to Jiangmen's jurisdiction.

In June 1983, the city was upgraded to a prefecture-level city.

In 1996, built the Jiangmen Hi-tech Industrial Development Zone (Jiangmen National-Level High-Tech Industry Development Zone) in Jianghai district.

In 2006, built the bingjiang Zone in pengjiang district.

In 2011, the city banned pet dogs in public after rabies killed 42 people over the preceding 3 years. The city reserved a 13-acre site to allow rural Chinese to adopt the 30,000 dogs, but public outcry led to a softer implementation where violators would be told to leave rather than have the dog confiscated.

In 2017, Jiangmen Hi-tech Industrial Development Zone ranked 64th among national hi-tech zones in China.

In 2020, Jiangmen Station of the West Pearl River Delta Transportation Center, in Southwest China's Guangdong province, opened to the public.

Geography

Climate

The climate is subtropical with monsoonal influences.

Economy
Jiangmen was selected by the Chinese state as a pilot city for a nationwide information programme. It was also chosen by the Pacific Economic Cooperation Council (PECC) as a trial city for the Regional Integration for Sustainable Economics (RISE) project. According to the World Bank's "Report on Investment Environment in China" for 2005, Jiangmen was ranked the sixth most conducive city in China for investment.

The economic development strategies within Jiangmen focus on the three urban districts, and the south, middle and north lines. It is planned to develop four main economic areas: the central urban district of the city, the Yinzhou Lake economic area, and two economic areas along the various transport axes.

In 2018, the city reported a GDP of 290.041 billion Yuan, government revenue totaling 24.393 billion Yuan, and retail sales totaling 140.758 billion Yuan.

Manufacturing industries
Similar to other cities in the western Pearl River Delta, the manufacturing sector plays a significant role in Jiangmen's economy. The chief industries include manufacturing of machinery, textiles, paper, food products, electronics, and building materials. Other major industries include motorcycles, household appliances, food processing, synthetic fibers and garments, and stainless steel products. Global brand names with a presence in the city include BP, Mitsubishi Heavy Industries, Hyundai, Panasonic, Veolia, Hutchison Whampoa, ABB Group, and Tesco. Some worldwide brand which have factories in Jiangmen such include Asia Pacific Resources International Holdings and Lee Kum Kee foods.

Uranium processing plant
The city was the proposed site of a $6.5 billion, 40 billion renminbi, uranium processing plant which would have supplied about half of the enriched uranium needed by China's nuclear power plants. Announcement of the plant in July 2013 was met by public protests. The proposal was withdrawn out of "respect for public opinion" shortly thereafter.

Jiangmen port
Jiangmen Port is the second largest river port in Guangdong province. The local government plans to develop a harbour industrial zone with heavy industries to include petrochemical and machinery plants, as well as an ocean-based economy.

Administration

Culture

Jiangmen is the ancestral homeland of approximately 4 million overseas Chinese, who live in 107 countries and regions throughout the world. Strong oversea connections are especially found in the villages. The dialect spoken in Jiangmen city itself is a Siyi Yue dialect, but is distinct from the Taishanese spoken in Taishan City.

Tourism

A significant amount of historical heritage survives from the period of mass emigration prior to World War II. The most significant are the fortified multi-story towers found mainly in Kaiping. These are known as "Gold Mountain Towers" or diaolou. A number of natural hotspring resorts has been developed successfully by using its wealthy natural heated ground water resources such as Gudou Hotspring Resort. Guifeng Mountain, a mountain visited by many tourists, is the peak of Jiangmen with an elevation of 545 meters above sea level.

The local government's economic development strategies emphasize the development of tourism and protection of the environment.

Education

Secondary Education

The only international school in Jiangmen is Boren Sino-Canadian School, while bilingual schools include WuYi Country Garden Bilingual School and China-Hong Kong English School.

Jiangmen No. 1 Middle School is claimed to be the top middle school in the district. It used to be one of the best middle schools in Guangdong Province in the 1980s and 1990s. However, the quality of its education has been dropping in recent years and within the district of Jiangmen, its status is being constantly challenged by schools such as Xinhui No. 1 Middle School in Xinhui, Kaiqiao (Kaiping Emigrant) Middle School in Kiaping and Heshan No.1 Middle School in Heshan.

Tertiary Education
Wuyi University is the only university located within the city, whereby it's a member of Guangdong-Hong Kong-Macao University Alliance (GHMUA).

Jiangmen Polytechnic College, located at Chaolian Island, enrolls about 13,000 students in various technical and humanities programs.

Transport

Roads and highways

Jiangmen has a mature network of inter-city and intra-city highways and expressways, whose total length has reached  as of 2016. G15 Shenyang–Haikou Expressway travels at the north, connecting downtown Jiangmen to three of its administrative divisions Heshan, Kaiping and Enping, as well as nearby cities Yangjiang, Zhongshan and Foshan.  goes along Jiangmen's coastlines, linking Zhuhai at the east and Yangjiang at the west. G94 Pearl River Delta Ring Expressway, S20 Guangzhou-Zhongshan-Jiangmen Expressway, G2518 Shenzhen-Cenxi Expressway and S47 Guangzhou-Foshan-Jiangmen-Zhuhai Expressway run through northeast Jiangmen. S49 Xinhui-Taishan Expressway connects Taishan and joints S32 at the south.

China National Highway 325 is the only highway in the national trunk road system that goes into Jiangmen. Several provincial highways, such as S273, S274, S276 and S367 link the city's suburb areas to major towns.

Railways

Although the very first railway, Sun Ning Railway, began operation in 1909, it was discontinued in 1938 to deny its use by the Japanese military. The second operational railway is the Jiangmen branch of Guangzhou–Zhuhai intercity railway (opened 2011), which provides frequent service from Jiangmen railway station / Jiangmen East railway station to Guangzhou South Railway Station, where connections to the nation's high-speed railway network are available. Since the late 2012, Jiangmen is also served by the freight-only Guangzhou–Zhuhai Railway. Shenzhen–Zhanjiang high-speed railway, which opened in 2018, connects Jiangmen at Jiangmen railway station and Xinhui railway station, Shuangshuizhen railway station, Taishan, Kaiping South railway station and Enping railway station. Since then, Jiangmen is served by direct trains to Shanghai.Jiangmen railway station of the West Pearl River Delta Transportation Center, opened to the public on 2020 Nov 16.Jiangmen north railway station in the West Pearl River Delta International Logistics Center, Opened in 2021.

Ferries

Making use of the Jiangmen Port facilities, Chu Kong Passenger Transport (CKS) connects Jiangmen with high speed ferry services to Hong Kong (95 nautical miles) taking about 2.5 hours each way.

Coaches

There are 18 coach terminals across Jiangmen as of 2016. 1,137 licensed coaches owned by 23 operators provide inter-county and inter-city bus services to major cities within and outside Guangdong.

Public transportation

Bus service within Pengjiang and Jianghai Districts are provided by Jiangmen Bus Co. Ltd.. Bus routes in Xinhui District were formerly operated by Macao-based Xinfuli Co., but all routes were consolidated into the city-owned bus system run by Jiangmen Automobile Transportation Group Co. Ltd. in 2010. Transit buses in other districts are operated by Jiangmen Automobile Transportation Group and other private companies.

By 2016, there are 1,077 taxicabs in Jiangmen, most of which are operated by local companies.

Notable people

 Adrienne Clarkson (born 1939), Broadcast journalist and Governor General of Canada (1999–2005)
 Alan Chin (born 1987), American contemporary artist
 Andy Lau (born 1961), Hong Kong's most commercially successful film actor
 Anna May Wong (1905–1961), actress
 Annie Wu Suk-ching, Founder of Beijing Air Catering Ltd. and member of the Standing Committee of the National Committee of Chinese People's Political Consultative Conference
 Anthony Wong (born 1961), Award-winning British Hong Kong actor, screenwriter and film director
 Arthur Chin (1913–1997), Kuomintang fighter pilot and flying ace
 Bill Lann Lee (born 1949), U.S. Assistant Attorney General for Civil Rights in the Clinton Administration
 Chen Yunchang (1919–2016), Actress considered to be the third "Queen of Chinese Cinema"
 Chin Siu Dek, Grandmaster of Kung Fu San Soo
 Danny Chan (1958–1993), Hong Kong singer
 Donnie Yen (born 1963), Hong Kong Chinese martial artist, actor, director, fight choreographer and producer
 Ed Lee (1952–2017), Mayor of San Francisco (2011–2017), born in Seattle but parents were immigrants from Taishan
 Evan Low (born 1983), Mayor of Campbell, California
 Flora Chan (born 1970), Hong Kong actress and singer
 Gary Locke (born 1950), Governor of Washington State (1996–2006), U.S. Secretary of Commerce (2009–2011) and U.S. Ambassador to China (2011–2014)
 Gordon Lam (born 1967), Hong Kong actor
 Hiram Fong (1906–2004), U.S. Senator from Hawaii (1959–1977)
 Hu Die (1908–1989), Actress considered to be the first "Queen of Chinese Cinema"
 Inky Mark (born 1947), Canadian politician, mayor of Dauphin (1994–1997) and Member of Parliament (1997–2004)
 Jack Yan (born 1972), Magazine publisher in New Zealand
 James Hong (born 1929), American actor with over 500 television, film and video game credits, and former civil engineer
 James Tak Wu, Founder of Maxim's Catering Limited, Hong Kong's largest food and beverage corporation and restaurant chain
 James Wong Howe (1899–1976), American cinematographer
 John Tsang (born 1951), Financial Secretary of Hong Kong
 Julius Chan (born 1939), Prime Minister of Papua New Guinea (1980–1982, 1994–1997, 1997)
 Ken Hom (born 1949), American chef, author and television–show presenter
 Kylie Kwong (born 1969), Australian chef, restaurateur, author and television-show presenter
 Leland Yee (born 1948), California State Senator and accused arms dealer
 Li Enliang (1912–2008), Chinese civil engineer and educator
 Margaret Chin (born 1954), American politician on the New York City Council representing Chinatown
 Matt Fong (1953–2011), Treasurer of the State of California (1995–1999)
 Mel Chin (born 1951), American contemporary conceptual artist
 Myolie Wu (born 1979), Hong Kong actress and singer
 Norman Kwong (born 1929), championship-winning Canadian football player (1948, 1954, 1955, 1956) and Lieutenant-Governor of Alberta (2005-2010)
 Patrick Yu (born 1922), Hong Kong lawyer, Crown Counsel and founder of its first law school
 Wong Koon Chung (born 1964), Lead guitarist for Beyond
 Raymond "Shrimp Boy" Chow (born 1959), Mobster and Dragon Head of the San Francisco Chinese Freemasons
 Shawn Yue (born 1981), Hong Kong actor and singer
 Tony Leung (born 1962), Hong Kong actor
 Tyrus Wong (born 1910), American painter, muralist, ceramicist, lithographer, designer and kite maker
 William Poy Lee (born 1951), American author of The Eighth Promise
 Wong Ka Keung (born 1964), Bassist for Beyond
 Wong Ka Kui (1962–1993), Lead singer of Beyond
 Wong Kim Ark (born 1871), Defendant in United States v. Wong Kim Ark - 169 U.S. 649 (1898)
 Wu Lien-teh (1879–1960), doctor
 Yip Sai Wing (born 1963), Drummer for Beyond

See also
 List of prefecture-level divisions of China

References

External links

 Jiangmen International Website 

 
Prefecture-level divisions of Guangdong